Mohammadhossein Zavari (born January 11, 2001) is an Iranian football midfielder who currently plays for Esteghlal in the Persian Gulf Pro League.

Club career

Sanat Naft
He made his debut for Sanat Naft in 2nd fixtures of 2020–21 Persian Gulf Pro League against Persepolis while he substituted in for Taleb Rikani.

Honours 
Esteghlal
Iranian Super Cup:  2022

References

Living people
2001 births
People from Gorgan
Association football midfielders
Iranian footballers
Sanat Naft Abadan F.C. players
Esteghlal F.C. players
Persian Gulf Pro League players